American Art is a journal publishing peer-reviewed innovative scholarship on the history of art and related visual culture. It critically engages with the material and conceptual conditions of art and provides a forum for the expanding field of American art history. It welcomes scholarship on the role played by art in the ongoing transnational and transcultural formation of America as a contested geography, identity, and idea. Committed to rigorous inquiry, the journal presents a range of approaches to the production and consumption of art. It is published by the University of Chicago Press and was known until 1991 as Smithsonian Studies in American Art.

External links 
 
 Submission guidelines

Publications established in 1987
Triannual journals
English-language journals
University of Chicago Press academic journals
Visual art journals